Hill Grove or Hills Grove may refer to:

Hills Grove, North Carolina, an unincorporated community in Surry County
Hill Grove, Ohio, an unincorporated community in Darke County
Hill Grove, Virginia, an unincorporated community in Pittsylvania County